Amy Marie Weber (July 2, 1970) is an American actress, model, film producer, singer, real estate broker and former professional wrestling valet. She is best known for her time in WWE as a WWE Diva. She released an album, Let it Rain, the titular single for which stayed in the U.S. Billboard Chart for over a month. It was also released internationally via Dauman Music and Republic Digital and climbed to number 6 in the UK Singles Chart. Weber has been the face of a Shiseido cosmetic campaign.

Early career

Television
Weber is currently the Director of Residential Estates at the famed brokerage "The Agency." She has sold over $500,000,000 in her short 8 years in the real estate industry. Weber has been recognized by Los Angeles Magazine, Pasadena Magazine and The Wall Street Journal as an All-Star. Weber has played roles in numerous television series including CSI: Las Vegas, Son of the Beach, Andy Richter Controls the Universe, Saved by the Bell, Melrose Place, Pacific Blue, The Young and the Restless, Jenny, USA High and City Guys. She also appeared in country musician Toby Keith's video for his song "Whiskey Girl" as the Whiskey Girl, and, on December 31, 2004, she was featured in a sketch on the New Year's Eve live episode of The Tonight Show with Jay Leno. Weber teamed up with Tom Green who traveled all over New York City looking for someone to kiss him at midnight, which Weber eventually go to do.

Film
Weber has had lead roles in the movies Scarlet Mirror, The Bet, Dr. Life, Art House, Kolobos, The Contract, Starforce, Crackerjack III, Becoming Pony Boi, The Pumpkin Karver, and Transmorphers. She also had a lead role in the movie Diablita, and supporting roles in the movies The Adventures of Joe Dirt and Unbeatable Harold. She is also the executive producer and star of Crossroad. She was an associate producer on the film The Pumpkin Karver, in which she also starred.

Professional wrestling career

World Wrestling Entertainment (2004–2005)
A former WWE Diva Search contestant, Weber became a villainous diva for WWE's SmackDown! brand, with a gimmick as John "Bradshaw" Layfield's image consultant in The Cabinet. During her time in The Cabinet, she feuded with Joy Giovanni, who she defeated by forfeit in her only match. She resigned from WWE in February 2005 because of her allegations of harassment from some of the wrestlers. She later stated that she "wasn't happy with the pay" and the "frat house-like" environment. To explain her departure, JBL stated she had been "fired" for accidentally firing a sleeping dart at him the previous week while he was playing with an inflatable dinosaur. The dart was actually intended for JBL's No Way Out 2005 opponent, Big Show.

In April 2020, Weber further explained that the allegations of being bullied by Edge and Randy Orton had led to her WWE exit in 2005
So when I got to Alaska, Shane McMahon was there, we were all getting our bags, and I was done," Weber said. "I just felt like I couldn't continue to be in an environment where people had no respect for me. They had their reasons, but I don't think taking two ibuprofen is a reason for someone to call you names, try to physically harm you, and then pour a drink in your face. So that's the story.

Personal life
Weber briefly dated rock guitarist Robbie Crane but while on The Howard Stern Show said she had to sue him in small claims court over $4000 he borrowed but didn't pay back. Later, she was engaged to model/actor Dante Spencer in 2002 but ultimately married film producer David Dginger on May 17, 2008. The couple welcomed twins named Levi and Madison Grace on May 28, 2009.

Since leaving WWE, Weber has been working in modeling, movies, music, and eventually real estate businesses.

Filmography

Film

Television

Music videos

Stage
Weber has had starring roles in theater productions of Reservations for Two, 110 in the Shade, Apocalyptic Butterflies, Who's Afraid of Virginia Woolf?, and Grease.

Discography

Albums

Singles

References

External links
 AmyWeber.net (Official site)
 Amy Weber Fan Club (Official Facebook)
 
 Online World Of Wrestling profile

1970 births

American film actresses
American television actresses
Female models from Illinois
Living people
Professional wrestling managers and valets
WWE Diva Search contestants
People from Peoria, Illinois
21st-century American singers
21st-century American women singers
21st-century American actresses
1970 births